Edward Alfred Thomas (September 23, 1919 – August 10, 2015) was one of the first African Americans to work as a police officer for the Houston Police Department.

He was born on September 23, 1919, in Keatchi, Louisiana. He attended Southern University. Thomas was drafted and served in the Invasion of Normandy and the Battle of the Bulge. He joined the Houston Police Department in 1948. Thomas served for 63 years, the longest period of service of any municipal employee.

In July 2015 Houston Police Headquarters was renamed the Edward A. Thomas Building.

External links 
Shelia Jackson Lee. "TRIBUTE TO EDWARD ALFRED THOMAS, LONGEST SERVING AND GREATEST PATROL OFFICER IN THE HISTORY OF THE HOUSTON POLICE DEPARTMENT". Congressional Record Vol. 161, No. 121

References 

Houston Police Department officers
African-American police officers
American police officers
United States Army soldiers
African Americans in World War II
Military personnel from Louisiana
United States Army personnel of World War II
People from DeSoto Parish, Louisiana
People from Houston
Southern University alumni
1919 births
2015 deaths
21st-century African-American people
African-American United States Army personnel